Strapped is a 1993 American television crime drama film produced by HBO Showcase. The film was directed by Forest Whitaker and is the cinematic debut of Bokeem Woodbine. It features several rappers including Fredro Starr, Sticky Fingaz, Busta Rhymes, Yo-Yo and Kool Moe Dee.

Plot
Diquan Mitchell, a 19-year old ex-con, attempts to turn his life around and start legitimate work. At the beginning of the film, Mitchell witnesses an argument between two youths Chucky and Pharaoh in the stairwell of his apartment building upon arriving home. Deciding not to expose the youth who did the shooting to law enforcement, Mitchell takes the handgun used in the killing from him and tells him to run. Mitchell lives in a Brooklyn public housing project apartment with his mother, grandmother, and two sisters, and has a girlfriend named Latisha Jordan, who is 8 months pregnant.

Mitchell's girlfriend who is also an ex-felon gets caught selling crack cocaine to an undercover New York officer. After a hearing, a judge sets bail at $2500 for Jordan. Due to not having the funds to bail her out, Mitchell join forces with the police in a complicated undercover operation that involves selling guns on the street while selling information to the police. In addition to becoming an informant, Mitchell is also promised a deal by the cops that the lengthy imprisonment (of either 18 months or 8 years) and the case for Jordan would be dismissed if they successfully take down a gun salesman named Ben, who has been selling guns to neighborhood youths.

Mitchell teams up with his long-time friend Bamboo to help out with the case while pocketing cash from gun sales on the side. Shortly after bailing his girlfriend out of jail, Mitchell and Bamboo speaks with Ann, who puts them in contact with her brother in Georgia to buy guns to make their own profits. The cops later stake-out the location where Ben set-up to make sales, having arrested him earlier for possession of 150 firearms at his suburban-area home.

The cops are later informed by the ATF that they can't charge him due to lack of evidence that he is selling the weapons to youths. They later tell Mitchell that they need more evidence on Ben. After his run-in with the cops, Ben later returns to the neighborhood to locate Bamboo and runs into other youths who give him Bamboo's beeper number in return for multiple firearms.

Ben then reaches Bamboo on the phone and tells him that he is aware that Bamboo has been speaking with the cops about his gun selling business and threatens his life. Thereafter, Mitchell and Bamboo visits a local convenience store where Bamboo starts trouble by robbing an Asian cashier and making racist remarks. Bamboo then accidentally shoots a little girl. After being interrogated by the cops for the shooting, Mitchell and Bamboo are released from jail. Upon returning to the neighborhood, Mitchell is told by Lay-Lay that everybody has been saying he has been working with the cops.

After learning about Mitchell worked as a police informant, Bamboo later shows up at Mitchell's apartment to confront him about the news which leads to a fight and shootout between the two. Bamboo escapes from police and is never seen again afterwards. 

The film ends with Mitchell accepting responsibility for the youth killed at the beginning of the film, having used the gun during the shootout. In return for his guilty plea, the case against his girlfriend is dismissed. In court, Mitchell is sentenced to prison.

Cast

 Bokeem Woodbine as Diquan Mitchell
 Kia Goodwin as Latisha Jordan
 Willie James Stiggers, Jr. as Chucky
 Chi Ali as Pharaoh
 Michael Biehn as Matthew McRae
 Yul Vazquez as Latisha's Attorney
 Jermaine Hopkins as "Lay-Lay"
 Isaiah Washington as Willie
 Kool Moe Dee as Chaz
 Paul McCrane as Mitch Corman
 Samuel E. Wright as Dave
 Starletta DuPois as Mrs. Mitchell
 Monie Love as Yvonne Mitchell
 Yo-Yo as Ann
 Craig Wasson as Ben
 Busta Rhymes as Buster
 Fredro Starr (credited simply as Fredro) as Mark "Bamboo" Rivers

See also 
 List of hood films

References

External links

Strapped at HBO Films

1993 television films
1993 films
Films directed by Forest Whitaker
Films set in New York City
HBO Films films
1993 crime drama films
Films about drugs
American gang films
Hood films
American crime drama films
African-American drama films
1990s American films